Bouca is a town located in the Central African Republic prefecture of Ouham. It is not far east of Bossangoa at the Fafa river.

History 
On 21 March 2013, the town was overtaken by rebels of the Séléka coalition. On 9 September 2013 armed Anti-balaka fighters attacked the town killing at least three people. On 4 March 2021 Bouca was recaptured by government forces.

Climate 
Köppen-Geiger climate classification system classifies its climate as tropical wet and dry (Aw).

See also 
 List of cities in the Central African Republic
 Prefectures of the Central African Republic
 Lake Chad replenishment project
 Waterway

References 

Sub-prefectures of the Central African Republic
Populated places in Ouham-Fafa